Lamoria melanophlebia is a species of snout moth. It is found on Cyprus and the Caucasus.

References

Moths described in 1888
Tirathabini